Tropidophis feicki, also known commonly as the broad-banded dwarf boa, the broad-banded trope, and Feick's dwarf boa, is a species of non-venomous snake in the family Tropidophiidae. The species is endemic to Cuba.

Etymology
The specific name, feicki, is in honor of American biologist John R. Feick.

Description
T. feicki males can grow to  snout-to-vent length (SVL), and females to  SVL. There are 217–235 ventral scales and 34–41 subcaudal scales. The dorsal ground color is grey or pink. There is a saddle pattern dorsally, but no ventral pattern.

Geographic range
T. feicki is found in western Cuba, from Pedrera de Mendoza and Guane, Pinar del Río Province, east to Pan de Matanzas, Matanzas Province.

Habitat

Behavior
T. feicki is arboreal.

Diet
T. feicki preys upon small species of lizards.

Reproduction
T. feicki is viviparous.

References

Further reading
García-Padrón, L. Yusnaviel (2022). "Maximum Size and a New Dietary Record for the Broad-banded Trope , Tropidophis feicki (Squamata: Tropidophiidae), in Cuba". Reptiles & Amphibians 29 (1): 270–272.
Rodríguez-Cabrera TM, Torres J, Morell-Savall E (2020). "Easternmost record of the Cuban Broad-banded Trope, Tropidophis feicki (Squamata: Tropidophiidae)". Caribbean Herpetology 71: 1–3.
Schwartz A (1957). "A New Species of Boa (Genus Tropidophis) from Western Cuba". American Museum Novitates (1839): 1-8. (Tropidophis feicki, new species).
Schwartz A, Henderson RW (1991). Amphibians and Reptiles of the West Indies: Descriptions, Distributions, and Natural History. Gainesville: University of Florida Press. 720 pp. . (Tropidophis feicki, p. 633).

Tropidophiidae
Reptiles of Cuba
Endemic fauna of Cuba
Taxa named by Albert Schwartz (zoologist)
Reptiles described in 1957